Arthur Graves Sampson (October 24, 1898 – March 1984) was an American college football player and coach. He served as the head football coach at Tufts University from 1926 to 1929.

References

1898 births
1984 deaths
Columbia Lions football coaches
Harvard Crimson football coaches
Tufts Jumbos football coaches
Tufts University alumni
Sportspeople from Weymouth, Massachusetts